De La Salle College, Colombo is the only school in Sri Lanka dedicated to the Patron Saint of Christian Teachers St. John Baptist de la Salle, founder of the congregation of De La Salle Brothers of the Christian Schools in Latin: "Fratres Scholarum Christianarum"(FSC).

Directors / Principals
The college was inaugurated on 1 February 1905 by the LaSallian Brothers. Since then the school has been headed by many LaSallian Brothers as listed below.

HOUSE SYSTEM
Rev Br Luke Gregory, introduced a house system, with four houses: Edward, Augustine, Luke and Hermenegild, each named after a De La Salle brother. This system is used for events such as inter-house sports and athletics.

Edward House
Named after the Founder of the school  Junianus Edward, guardian and the presiding genius of the De La Salle School from 1 February 1905 to 15 July 1925.  German Junianus Edward was appointed Director of De La Salle Brothers' Mother House in Mutwal, Colombo on 8 July 1904 and was appointed the first Provincial Visitor of the De La Salle Brothers newly erected District of Colombo on 1 September 1919.  
House Colour : Green

Augustine House
 The first college hall was built by Augustine Joseph FSC during his tenure as director of the college between 1919 and 1923.
House Colour : Blue

Luke House
Named after Luke Gregory.
House Colour : Red

Hermenegild House
Named after Hermenegild Joseph.
House Colour : Yellow

SPORTS & GAMES

Athletics

Basketball

Cricket

Soccer

Volleyball

Swimming

CLUBS & SOCIETIES

Battle of the DEs
The Mazenodian-LaSallian (The Battle of the DEs) was an annual cricket encounter between De Mazenod College, Kandana and De La Salle College, Mutwal in since 1955. It is known as The Battle of the DEs due to the names of the two schools.

References

External links
 Official website
 Old LaSallians Union
 La Sallian Federation of Sri Lanka
 World Union of Lasallian Former Students
 La Salle Colombo
 Archdiocese of Colombo

1905 establishments in Ceylon
Educational institutions established in 1905
Schools in Colombo
Colombo